This articles presents detailed results of the Japanese 2017 general election of members of the House of Representatives. It lists all elected Representatives in the 289 single-member districts and the 11 regional proportional representation (PR) blocks. Subsequent by-elections and the PR block replacement candidates to be elected later without additional vote in cases of death, resignation or disqualification (kuriage-tōsen) are not listed.

District results are only for winners, runners-up and any other candidates that received above 20% of the vote; in the following format: Candidate (nominating – endorsing parties) vote share. Endorsements by parties that have not nominated any candidates themselves are not included. Party affiliations are as of election day, subject to change at any time, composition may have already changed by the opening session of the first post-election Diet (see the List of members of the Diet of Japan).

Overall results
Party names are abbreviated as follows:
 Ruling parties (Conservative, Right-wing)
 L Jiyūminshutō, Liberal Democratic Party of Japan (LDP)
 K Kōmeitō, Komeito
 Cooperation partners outside the cabinet (Conservative, Right-wing)
 Kokoro Nippon no Kokoro (Japan's Heart), "English" Party for Japanese Kokoro
 Daichi Shintō Daichi, New Party Daichi
 Opposition parties (Centre-right)
 Kibō Kibō no Tō, English: Party of Hope (Conservative, Centre-right)
 Ishin Nippon Ishin no Kai (Japan Restoration/Innovation Association), "Nippon Ishin no Kai" (Centre-right)
 Opposition parties (Centre-left)
 CD Rikken Minshutō Constitutional Democratic Party of Japan (Liberal, Centre-left)
 C Nihon Kyōsantō, Japanese Communist Party (Left-wing)
 S Shakaiminshutō, Social Democratic Party (Centre-left)
 Only for retiring incumbents: D Minshintō (English: Democratic Party), English "Democratic Party" (no nominations, part of them ran as Party of Hope, others ran as independent)
 I Independent
 I→L Independents who won and were then retroactively nominated by L (note: some media already include them in the L count, others and the official results count them as I)
 I→CD Independents who won and were then retroactively nominated by CD
 Only for incumbents: I (D), (former) members of D contesting the election as independents
 Only for incumbents: I (LP), members of Jiyūtō, Liberal Party (no nominations) contesting the election as independents
 Minor parties not represented in the Diet before the election who have nominated candidates in 2017
 in both tiers
 HRP Kōfuku-jitsugen-tō, Happiness Realization Party
 in the PR tier
 Shijinashi Seitō shiji nashi ("no political party supported")
 in the FPTP tier
 Kyōwa Inumaru Katsuko to Kyōwatō ("Katsuko Inumaru and the Republican/Cooperation Party")
 Tokakushin Tosei o kakushin suru kai ("Association to reform Metropolitan politics")
 Fair Fea-tō, Fairness Party
 Workers Rōdō no kaihō o mezasu rōdōshatō, The Workers Party aiming for liberation of labour
 WECP Sekai-keizai-kyōdōtai-tō, World Economic Community Party
 Zero Giin hōshū zero o jitsugen suru kai ("Association to implement zero remuneration for MPs")
 Const9 Shintō kenpō 9-jo ("New party [for] Constitution Article 9")
 NaganoFirst Nagano-ken o Nihon-ichi kōkeiki ni suru kai ("Association to make Nagano prefecture first in Japan in prosperity")
 JNP Nihon Shintō (Japan New Party)

Electoral districts affected by the 2017 redistricting and reapportionment are marked as follows:
 Hokkaidō 1 §: Boundary changed
 Tōhoku block $: Magnitude changed
 Aomori 4: Eliminated

'Proportional votes won by party in each prefecture and overall proportional success of each of the three main coalitions (with the LDP/Komeito-allied Party for Japanese Kokoro and New Party Daichi counted among the governing coalition percentages). The right-opposition combines the votes given to Kibō no Tō and the Japan Innovation Party (Ishin). The left-opposition includes the Constitutional Democratic Party, the Social Democratic Party, and the Japanese Communist Party.

 Hokkaidō 

 Tōhoku 

 Northern Kantō 

 Southern Kantō 

 Tokyo 

 Hokuriku-Shin'etsu 

 Tōkai Note: As the Constitutional Democratic Party has nominated too few proportional candidates, one seat was reallocated to the next party who would have received a seat; the original d'Hondt allocation according to vote shares is given in parentheses.''

Kinki

Chūgoku

Shikoku

Kyūshū

References

External links
2017 election pages by major news media:
 Yomiuri
 Asahi
 Nikkei
 Mainichi
 NHK
Ministry of Internal Affairs and Communications: Results of the 48th general election of members of the House of Representatives and the retention referendum for Supreme Court judges

General elections in Japan
2017 elections in Japan
Election results in Japan